Mulraney is a surname. Notable people with the surname include:

 Jake Mulraney (born 1996), Irish footballer
 Jock Mulraney (1916–2001), Scottish footballer

See also
 Mullaney
 Mulroney
 Mulvaney